Lithium hexafluorophosphate is an inorganic compound with the formula LiPF6. It is a white crystalline powder.

Production
LiPF6 is manufactured by reacting phosphorus pentachloride with hydrogen fluoride and lithium fluoride 

PCl5 + LiF + 5 HF →  LiPF6 + 5 HCl

Suppliers include Targray and Morita Chemical Industries Co., Ltd

Chemistry

The salt is relatively stable thermally, but loses 50% weight at 200 °C (392 °F). It hydrolyzes near 70 °C (158 °F) according to the following equation forming highly toxic HF gas:
LiPF6 + H2O → LiF + 2 HF + OPF3

Owing to the Lewis acidity of the Li+ ions, LiPF6 also catalyses the tetrahydropyranylation of tertiary alcohols.

In lithium-ion batteries, LiPF6 reacts with Li2CO3, which may be catalysed by small amounts of HF:

LiPF6 + Li2CO3 → POF3 + CO2 + 3 LiF

Application
The main use of LiPF6 is in commercial secondary batteries, an application that exploits its high solubility in polar aprotic solvents. Specifically, solutions of lithium hexafluorophosphate in carbonate blends of ethylene carbonate, dimethyl carbonate, diethyl carbonate and/or ethyl methyl carbonate, with a small amount of one or many additives such as fluoroethylene carbonate and vinylene carbonate, serve as state-of-the-art electrolytes in lithium-ion batteries. This application also exploits the inertness of the hexafluorophosphate anion toward strong reducing agents, such as lithium metal.

References

Lithium salts
Hexafluorophosphates
Electrolytes